Live In Rio is the third live material by Mexican pop group RBD. The video was recorded on October 8, 2006, before an audience of 100,000 people at the Maracanã Stadium in Rio de Janeiro, Brazil on the group's Tour Brasil 2006.

RBD made history in this concert by becoming the first Spanish language act to sell out the Maracanã, overshadowing in the process the turnouts for acts such as Luis Miguel or Guns N' Roses with 50.000 . This particular concert also saw the first performance of "Ser O Parecer", RBD's lead single off of their then upcoming third studio album, Celestial.

The DVD included extra features such as a documentary following RBD's first Brazilian concert tour, in which the group performed 13 sold-out concerts in 12 cities; the main being Manaus, Belém, Belo Horizonte, Brasilia, Porto Alegre (the only city in which they played two concerts), Sao Paulo, and finishing on Rio de Janeiro, where the DVD was filmed. Other special features on the DVD include a behind-the-scenes documentary hosted by a teenage fan, showing other fans in line for the concert, as well as the tour's crew. A photo gallery with pictures of fans dressed as "rebeldes", taken during the line for the concert, was also included.

An official 2-CD promotional live album was made in Mexico, but was not released for sale, just distributed to radio stations. In Brazil, a special limited edition of the album was distributed to subscribers of cable TV channel Boomerang (in which RBD's originating telenovela, Rebelde, was shown) with a cardboard cover imitating the school uniform the characters wore in the telenovela.

Background and release

In 2006, RBD band member Anahí confirmed the recording of the live concert DVD at the Maracanã Stadium, stating: "Imagine our excitement, RBD will record their new live album in the Maracanã Stadium. I think it is a gift for the people who truly love us, plus I have so much faith in that concert and very soon you will be able to see it (in DVD) so you can see what happened."

The DVD was filmed on October 8, 2006, before a crowd of more than 50,000 people in Rio de Janeiro, Brazil. The filmed concert was part of the tour the band made throughout the country, titled Tour Brasil 2006, which reached 13 Brazilian cities. The concert was filmed by 27 cameras recording simultaneously, with an additional two floating overhead by helicopter.

The concert's setlist consisted of songs from RBD's first two studio albums, Rebelde and Nuestro Amor, while also having the premiere of "Ser O Parecer", the lead single from the group's then upcoming album, Celestial. RBD became the first Mexican group to perform at the Maracanã Stadium and to go on tour through various Brazilian cities. The live concert DVD was released on February 2, 2007, in Brazil and on March 20, 2007, in the United States and Mexico.

RBD band member Alfonso Herrera recommended the release, stating: "It's a wonderful DVD, I had the opportunity to sneak a few peaks, it's impressive, from the venue to how they made it and the show is incredible, the fireworks, it's awe-inspiring." Fellow group member Maite Perroni defined the concert as one full of passion, love, and talked about the warm welcome of the people, stating: "We ended dancing samba, we were very happy with all the people. The truth is that there has been many, many experiences like that one, it was a very beautiful moment."

Track listing
 "Abertura" (Intro) – 0:51
 "Rebelde" – 3:32
 "Santa No Soy" – 3:07
 "Así Soy Yo" – 3:00
 "Feliz Cumpleaños"  – 3:32
 "Enséñame" – 3:36
 "Qué Fue Del Amor"  – 3:31
 "Cuando El Amor Se Acaba" – 3:53
 "Una Canción" – 3:39
 "Este Corazón" –3:28
 "Solo Para Ti" – 4:53
 "Me Voy" – 3:35
 "Sálvame"  – 9:00
 "Tenerte Y Quererte"  – 3:42
 "Apresentacão da Banda" (Band Introduction) – 8:45
 "No Pares" – 4:37
 "A Tu Lado" – 6:34
 "Fuera"  – 3:37
 "Solo Quédate En Silencio"  – 3:43
 "Qué Hay Detrás" – 4:34
 "Un Poco De Tu Amor"  – 4:46
 "Aún Hay Algo" – 4:19
 "Tras De Mí" – 4:28
 "Ser O Parecer" – 3:39
 "Nuestro Amor"  – 3:54
 "Rebelde" (Portuguese rock version) – 3:44
 "Samba da Mocidade: O Grande Circo Místico/Citacão da Música: Sou Brasileiro" – 8:48

Bonus material
 RBD News (Behind the scenes/Making of the DVD) – 19:52
 Eu Sou RBD (Photo Gallery) – 0:27
 Por Trás do Palco (Documentary) – 14:52

Live album

Live in Rio is also an official two-CD live album of the recorded song performances of the concert held at the Maracanã Stadium in Rio de Janeiro, Brazil on October 8, 2006.

The double-disc album's pressing was made in Mexico, but was not released for sale, just distributed to radio stations in early 2007. In Brazil, a special limited edition of the album was distributed to subscribers of cable TV channel Boomerang (in which RBD's originating telenovela, Rebelde, was shown) with a cardboard cover imitating the school uniform the characters wore in the telenovela. In 2020 the album was officially released in CD in Mexico and digitally in the world.

The promotional release actually contained 12 live songs on each of the two discs. The album omitted the live concert audio of all intros, medleys, musical interludes, the Christopher on drums section, and the band introduction.

Track listing 

 Notes
"Me Voy" is the Spanish cover version of Kelly Clarkson's "Gone", originally released on Clarkson's Multi-Platinum album Breakaway (2004).
"Feliz Cumpleaños (Happy Worstday)" is the Spanish version of Swedish singer Mikeyla's "Happy Worst Day".

Personnel
Credits adapted from the DVD's liner notes.

Recorded live at
 Maracanã Stadium (Rio de Janeiro, Brazil)

Performance credits
RBD – main artist

Musicians

Güido Laris – bass, classical guitar, musical director, vocal direction
Gonzalo Velázquez – classical guitar, guitar
Carlos María "Charly" Rey – background vocals, classical guitar, guitar

Mauricio Soto "Bicho" – drums, percussion
Luis Emilio Arreaza "Catire" – drums, percussion
Eduardo "Eddy" Tellez – keyboards

Production

Luis Luisillo Miguel –  associate producer
Luciane Ribeiro - design, visual programming
Paulo Pelá - design, visual programming
Santiago Ferraz –  DVD authoring, principal photography
Pedro Damián –  executive producer
Marcos Hermes – graphic design, photography
Adriana Trigona – graphic design
Carolina Palomo Ramos –  production coordinator

Charts

Weekly charts (2007)

Year-end charts (2007)

Release information
The DVD had several release dates, though the official release date was February 2, 2007 in Brazil. According to Amazon.com, the DVD had a US release on March 20, 2007. In Spain,  the DVD spent 19 weeks at number one and was the fourth most sold music DVD in Spain in 2007. In the United States, the DVD was released before March 20 in some retailers, such as Wal-Mart.

References

RBD video albums